Peter Engels is a Professor of Physics at the Washington State University, who conducts research in the field of ultracold atomic gases.  His group at WSU performs a variety of experiments involving quantum hydrodynamics, spin–orbit coupling (See Spin–orbit interaction), soliton formation, condensed matter physics, and more using Rb-87 (bosonic) and K-40 (fermionic). Recently, in collaboration with the theorists Prof. Michael Forbes, Yongping Zhang, and Thomas Busch, his team published research demonstrating negative mass hydrodynamics in a spin–orbit coupled Bose–Einstein condensate.

References

Living people
Year of birth missing (living people)
21st-century American physicists
Washington State University faculty
Fellows of the American Physical Society